Architectural geometry is an area of research which combines applied geometry and architecture, which looks at the design, analysis and manufacture processes. It lies at the core of architectural design and strongly challenges contemporary practice, the so-called architectural practice of the digital age.

Architectural geometry is influenced by following fields: differential geometry, topology, fractal geometry, and cellular automata.

Topics include:
 freeform curves and surfaces creation
 developable surfaces
 discretisation
 generative design
 digital prototyping and manufacturing

See also 
Geometric design
Computer-aided architectural design
Mathematics and architecture
Fractal geometry
Blobitecture

References

External links 
Theory
Charles Jencks: The New Paradigm in Architecture
Institutions
Geometric Modeling and Industrial Geometry
Städelschule Architecture Class
SIAL - The Spatial Information Architecture Laboratory
Companies
Evolute Research and Consulting
Events
Smart Geometry
Advances in Architectural Geometry,( Conference Proceedings, 80MB)
Resource collections
Geometry in Action: Architecture
Tools
K3DSurf — A program to visualize and manipulate Mathematical models in three, four, five and six dimensions. K3DSurf supports Parametric equations and Isosurfaces
JavaView — a 3D geometry viewer and a mathematical visualization software.
Generative Components — Generative design software that captures and exploits the critical relationships between design intent and geometry.
ParaCloud GEM— A software for components population based on points of interest, with no requirement for scripting.
Grasshopper— a graphical algorithm editor tightly integrated with Rhino's 3-D modeling tools.

Computer-aided design
Computer-aided design software

ar:جيوميترية العمارة